Philip Thompson may refer to:

 Philip Thompson (Kentucky politician) (1789–1836), U.S. Representative from Kentucky
 Philip B. Thompson Jr. (1845–1909), U.S. Representative from Kentucky
 Philip R. Thompson (1766–1837), U.S. Representative from Virginia
 Phil Thompson (born 1954), footballer
 Phil Thompson (producer), UK producer and DJ

See also
 Phillip Thompson (born 1988), Australian politician from Queensland